Boris Beizer (1934-2018) was an American software engineer and author. He received his B.S. degree in physics from the City College of New York in 1956, an MS in Electrical Engineering (1963) and a PhD in computer science from the University of Pennsylvania in 1966. He wrote many books and articles on topics such as system architecture and software testing.  His books Software Testing Techniques and Software System Testing and Quality Assurance are frequently consulted references on the subject. He directed testing for the FAA's Weather Message Switching Center and several other large communications systems. He was a speaker at many testing conferences and was also known for his seminars on testing. He consulted on software testing and quality assurance with many organizations throughout the world.

Personal life

Boris Beizer was born in Brussels, Belgium. He emigrated to the United States in May, 1941.

List of publications (partial)
  Software Quality Reflections Essays, dialogues and poems, 2000
 Black-box testing: techniques for functional testing of software and systems (1995) ; Japanese edition, Nikei
 The frozen keyboard: living with bad software (1988) 
 Personal computer quality: a guide for victims and vendors (1986) 
 Software system testing and quality assurance (1984) 
 Software testing techniques (1983) ; expanded Second edition 1990; Japanese Edition Nikei
 Micro-analysis of computer system performance (1978) ; Russian Edition
 Communications Processor System (1977) with Kenneth Hagstrom
 The architecture and engineering of digital computer complexes, Volume 1 (1971), Volume 2; Polish and Russian Editions
 Engineering applications of Boolean algebra (1958) with Stephen W. Leibholz

Novels under pseudonym Ethan I. Shedley

References

External links
Software Development Quotations by Boris Beizer

University of Pennsylvania School of Engineering and Applied Science alumni
Software testing people
City College of New York alumni
1934 births
2018 deaths
Belgian emigrants to the United States